Judy Chan Ka-pui (born 4 April 1980) is a Hong Kong politician who is a current member of the Legislative Council of Hong Kong elected through the Elections Committee. She is a member of the New People's Party and was a former member of Southern District Council for South Horizons West, until 2019.

Biography
Daughter of an antique store owner, Chan lived on the Peak and graduated from Monash University. She says that she worked in the United States for seven years before relocating to Hong Kong. She was a founding member of the New People's Party (NPP) and became known when she contested in the Southern District Council by-election in South Horizons West in 2014, defeating two pro-democracy heavyweights, the Democratic Party's former Legislative Council member Sin Chung-kai and People Power chairwoman Erica Yuen.

She then became seen as a future successor to NPP chairwoman Regina Ip. She also stood in the 2016 Legislative Council election in Hong Kong Island as a second candidate. Her ticket received more than 60,000 votes, the highest votes a ticket received in the constituency. She relinquished her United States citizenship to stand in the election.

In the 2018 Hong Kong Island by-election triggered by the oath-taking controversy which resulted in the disqualification of Demosisto's Nathan Law, Chan became the pro-Beijing representative to run against Au Nok-hin. Despite receiving more than 120,000 votes, she lost to Au with a narrow margin of 3.5 per cent.

On 5 January 2022, Carrie Lam announced new warnings and restrictions against social gathering due to potential COVID-19 outbreaks. One day later, it was discovered that Chan attended a birthday party hosted by Witman Hung Wai-man, with 222 guests.  At least one guest tested positive with COVID-19, causing all guests to be quarantined. Chan was warned by Legislative Council president Andrew Leung to not attend any meetings until after finishing her last mandatory Covid-19 test on 22 January 2022. However, she decided to attend the meeting on 19 January 2022, against Leung's orders. About the party, Chan said "It was held shortly after an intense Legislative Council election, and the same day as our oath-taking ceremony, so we just went there to chill and celebrate".

In September 2022, Chan tested positive for COVID-19.

In 2022, one of the first motions passed in the Legislative Council came from Chan, who urged a crackdown on foreign domestic helpers who were "job hopping" or leaving their employers early.

References

1980 births
Living people
Monash University alumni
District councillors of Southern District
New People's Party (Hong Kong) politicians
Hong Kong emigrants to the United States
HK LegCo Members 2022–2025
Members of the Election Committee of Hong Kong, 2021–2026
Hong Kong pro-Beijing politicians